Alessandra Fanali (born 30 July 1999) is an Italian professional golfer who plays on the Ladies European Tour. She was runner-up at the 2022 Ladies Italian Open.

Amateur career
Fanali is from Fiuggi, Lazio near Rome and has represented Marco Simone Golf and Country Club after she started playing at Fiuggi Golf Club. She joined the Italian National Team and won the 2016 European Girls' Team Championship in Oslo together with Caterina Don, Alessia Nobilio and Emilie Alba Paltrinieri, beating a Swedish team with Maja Stark, Linn Grant and Frida Kinhult in the final.

In 2017 she represented Europe in the Junior Solheim Cup, and in 2018 she lost a playoff at the Italian International Ladies Amateur Championship to Emma Spitz of Austria.

Fanali appeared four times for Italy in the European Ladies' Team Championship, finishing 4th in 2018 after they lost their semi-final to Sweden, securing the bronze against Germany in 2019, and losing the final in 2022 to England.

Fanali played college golf at Arizona State University with the Arizona State Sun Devils women's golf team 2018–22 alongside Linn Grant. She was named All-American and recorded one individual title.

In 2019, she made a hole-in-one at the Annika Intercollegiate, and played in the inaugural Augusta National Women's Amateur.

Fanali shot a 67 in the final round of the 2022 Ladies Italian Open at Margara Golf Club to join a playoff with Morgane Métraux and Meghan MacLaren. She birdied the first playoff hole but Métraux sank a 20-foot putt for eagle to win.

Professional career
Fanali turned professional after graduating in 2022 and secured her card for the 2023 Ladies European Tour at Q-School. She started her rookie season well, with top-10 finishes at the Lalla Meryem Cup and the South African Women's Open.

Amateur wins
2016 Coppa d'Oro Citta di Roma, Quercia d'Oro, Castello di Marco Simone Trophy
2017 Castello di Marco Simone Trophy
2022 Silverado Showdown
 
Source:

Team appearances
Amateur
Junior Solheim Cup (representing Europe): 2017
World Junior Girls Championship (representing Italy): 2017
European Girls' Team Championship (representing Italy): 2016, 2017
European Ladies' Team Championship (representing Italy): 2018, 2019, 2020, 2022

Source:

References

External links

Italian female golfers
Ladies European Tour golfers
Arizona State Sun Devils women's golfers
Sportspeople from the Province of Frosinone
1999 births
Living people